The 2018 Texas A&M–Commerce Lions football team represented Texas A&M University–Commerce in the 2018 NCAA Division II football season. They were led by head coach Colby Carthel, who was in his sixth season at Texas A&M–Commerce. The Lions played their home games at Memorial Stadium and were members of the Lone Star Conference.

The Lions finished the regular season with a record of 9–2 and second place in the conference. The team made the NCAA Division II playoffs, losing in the regional semifinal to Tarleton State.

Previous season
The 2017 team finished with an overall record of 14–1. The team won the 2017 Division II Championship Game and quarterback Luis Perez was awarded the Harlon Hill Trophy. This was the program's first Division II championship and second overall championship. The team's only loss was to instate rival Midwestern State.

Schedule
The schedule consisted of six home games and five away games in the regular season. The Lions hosted conference foes Texas A&M–Kingsville, Tarleton State, West Texas A&M, and Angelo State and traveled to Eastern New Mexico, Midwestern State, Western New Mexico, and Texas–Permian Basin.

The Lions hosted non-conference foes Lock Haven from the Pennsylvania State Athletic Conference and Colorado State–Pueblo from the Great Plains Athletic Conference and traveled to William Jewell from the Great Lakes Valley Conference.

Schedule Source:

Roster

Game summaries

Texas A&M–Kingsville

Statistics

at William Jewell

Statistics

at Eastern New Mexico

Statistics

Colorado State–Pueblo

Statistics

Lock Haven

Statistics

vs. Midwestern State

Statistics

Tarleton State

Statistics

at Western New Mexico

Statistics

West Texas A&M

Statistics

at Texas–Permian Basin

Statistics

Angelo State

Statistics

at Minnesota–Dululth (Regional Quarterfinal)

Statistics

at Tarleton State (Regional semifinal)

Statistics

Rankings

References

Texas AandM-Commerce
Texas A&M–Commerce Lions football seasons
Texas AandM-Commerce Lions football